The al-Nabi Mosque ( – Masjed al-Nabi, also known as:  – Masjed-e Soltani) is a famous mosque in Qazvīn. The mosque has an area of about 14,000 m2, and bears inscriptions indicating that Fath Ali Shah of the Qajar dynasty was the founder of the mosque. Other sources however indicate that the mosque has been in existence since the Safavid period. It is now believed that the architect of the structure was Ustad Mirza Shirazi with the date of construction being 1787. This glorious mosque also known as Masjed Nabi, Masjed Soltani or Masjed Shah.

Specifications
Its double layered dome measures 15m in inner-diameter, with the top of the inner layer positioned at 20.83m above ground level, while the external apex is 23.25m high.

There was formerly an elevated minaret flanking the dome, of which the French explorer Madame Jane Dieulafoy had written. The mosque has four iwans in its courtyard.

The portal contains an inscription in nastaliq calligraphy dated 1787 CE. Similar to Qazvin's Masjed e Jame (Congregation Mosque), this mosque has a shabestan that is now used as a library.

See also
 List of Mosques in Iran
 Iranian architecture
 Islamic architecture

References

Further reading
 

Religious buildings and structures completed in 1787
Mosques in Iran
Qazvin
1787 establishments in Iran
Buildings and structures in Qazvin Province
Mosque buildings with domes